Tunisia, officially the Tunisian Republic, is the northernmost country in Africa. It is a Maghreb country and is bordered by Algeria to the west, Libya to the southeast, and the Mediterranean Sea to the north and east. Its area is almost , with an estimated population of just over 10.4 million. Its name is derived from the capital Tunis located in the north-east.

Tunisia is the smallest of the nations situated along the Atlas mountain range. Both played a prominent role in ancient times, first with the famous Phoenician city of Carthage, then as the Roman province of Africa, which was known as the "bread basket" of Rome. In modern times, starting in December 2010, Tunisia was the initial location of the Arab Spring, which spread in a revolutionary wave to Algeria, Bahrain, Egypt, Jordan, Libya, Morocco, Djibouti, Iran, Yemen and Syria by April 2011.

Articles related to Tunisia include:

A 

 Africa Province
 Aghlabid Dynasty
 Almohad Dynasty
 Arab Islamic Republic
 Ariana Governorate
 Atlas Mountains
 Aurès Mountains

B 

 Barbary pirate
 Barbary Slave Trade
 the First Barbary War and the Second Barbary War
 Battle of Ad Decimum (533)
 Battle of Adys (255 BC)
 Battle of Cape Bon (1941)
 Battle of Carthage (238)
 Battle of Carthage (698)
 Battle of Carthage (c. 149 BC)
 Battle of Djerba (1560)
 Battle of Ruspina (46 BC)
 Battle of Thapsus (46 BC)
 Battle of the Great Plains (203 BC)
 Battle of Tricamarum (533)
 Battle of Tunis (255 BC)
 Battle of Zama (202 BC)
 Bavagaliana
 Béja Governorate
 Ben Arous Governorate
 Berber Jews
 Bizerte Governorate
 Borj El Amri Airport
 Bourse de Tunis
 Brik

C 

 Cap Bon (also known as Sharik Peninsula)
 Carthage
 Carthago delenda est
 Central Bank of Tunisia
 Chamber of Councilors
 Chamber of Deputies of Tunisia
 Checkpoint 303
 Chergui
 Chermoula
 Chott el Djerid (salt lake)
 Coat of arms of Tunisia
 Confédération Générale des Travailleurs Tunisiens
 Conquest of Tunis (1535)
 Constitution of Tunisia
 Constitutional Democratic Rally
 Court of Cassation (Tunisia)
 Couscous
 Cuisine of Tunisia
 Culture of Tunisia

D 

 Demographics of Tunisia
 Destour
 Diocese of Africa
 Djebel Zaghouan
 Djerba - Zarzis International Airport
 Djerba

E 

 Economy of Tunisia
 Elections in Tunisia
 Entreprise Tunisienne d'Activités Pétrolières (state-owned)

F 

 Fatimid Dynasty
 First Barbary War (1801–1805)
 Flag of Tunisia
 Foreign relations of Tunisia
 French occupation of Tunisia

G 

 Gabès Governorate
 Gafsa Governorate
 Galite Islands
 Geography of Tunisia
 Gharbi
 Governorates of Tunisia
 Gulf of Gabès
 Gulf of Hammamet
 Gulf of Tunis

H 

 Habib Bourguiba
 Hafsid Dynasty
 Hamed Karoui
 Harissa
 Hedi Amara Nouira
 Hédi Baccouche
 History of the Jews in Tunisia
 History of Tunisia
 Hizb ut-Tahrir
 Human rights in Tunisia
 Humat al-Hima
 Husainid Dynasty

I 

 Ichkeul Lake
 Ifriqiya
 Islam in Tunisia

J 

 Jebel ech Chambi highest mountain in Tunisia–()
 Jendouba Governorate

K 

 Kairouan Governorate
 Karthago Airlines
 Kasserine Governorate
 Kebili Governorate
 Kef Governorate
 Kerkennah Islands

L 

 Lablabi
 Lake of Tunis (lagoon)
 Lake Tritonis (former lake)
 LGBT rights in Tunisia
 List of airlines of Tunisia
 List of airports in Tunisia
 List of Beys of Tunis
 List of cities in Tunisia
 Diplomatic missions of Tunisia
 List of political parties in Tunisia
 List of presidents of Tunisia
 List of Tunis Metro stations

M 

 Mahdia campaign of 1087
 Mahdia Governorate
 Makroudh
 Manouba Governorate
 Medenine Governorate
 Medjerda River (longest river of Tunisia)
 Merguez
 Métro léger de Tunis
 Mezwed
 Mohamed Ghannouchi
 Mohammed Mzali
 Monastir - Habib Bourguiba International Airport
 Monastir Governorate
 Mouvement d'Unité Populaire
 Movement Ettajdid
 Movement of Socialist Democrats
 Mrazig
 Music of Tunisia

N 

 Nabeul Governorate
 Neo Destour
 Nichan Iftikhar (order)
 Northern Berber languages
 Nouvelair
 Numhyd

O 

 Operation Wooden Leg (1985)

P 

 Party of People's Unity
 Politics of Tunisia
 Prime Minister of Tunisia
 Progressive Democratic Party (Tunisia)

R 

 Rachid Sfar
 Ramsar sites in Tunisia
 Ras ben Sakka (northernmost point of Africa)
 Renaissance Party
 Roman Catholicism in Tunisia

S 

 SBA Airlines (planned)
 Second Barbary War (1815)
 Sened language (extinct)
 Sevenair
 Sfax - Thyna International Airport
 Sfax Governorate
 Sfax
 Shakshouka
 Shelha language (disambiguation)
 Sidi Bou Zid Governorate
 Siliana Governorate
 Social Liberal Party (Tunisia)
 Socialist Destourian Party
 Société des transports de Tunis
 Sousse Governorate
 Sport in Tunisia
 Strait of Sicily

T 

 Tataouine Governorate
 TGM
 Tozeur - Nefta International Airport
 Tozeur Governorate
 Transport in Tunisia
 Treaty of Bardo (1881)
 Tunis Governorate
 Tunis Open
 Tunis Sports City
 Tunis-Carthage International Airport
 Tunis (capital city, most populous city)
 Tunisair
 Tunisia – United States relations
 Tunisia at the 1960 Summer Olympics
 Tunisia at the 1964 Summer Olympics
 Tunisia at the 1968 Summer Olympics
 Tunisia at the 1972 Summer Olympics
 Tunisia at the 1976 Summer Olympics
 Tunisia at the 1984 Summer Olympics
 Tunisia at the 1988 Summer Olympics
 Tunisia at the 1992 Summer Olympics
 Tunisia at the 1996 Summer Olympics
 Tunisia at the 2000 Summer Olympics
 Tunisia at the 2004 Summer Olympics
 Tunisia at the Olympics
 Tunisia Campaign (1942–1943)
 Tunisia Davis Cup team
 Tunisia Fed Cup team
 Tunisia in the Eurovision Song Contest
 Tunisia Monitoring Group
 Tunisia national basketball team
 Tunisia national football team
 Tunisia national rugby sevens team
 Tunisia national rugby union team
 Tunisia women's national basketball team
 Tunisian Arabic
 Tunisian Communist Party
 Tunisian Coupe de la Ligue Professionnelle
 Tunisian dinar
 Tunisian duro
 Tunisian Football Federation
 Tunisian General Labour Union
 Tunisian passport
 Tunisian President Cup
 Tunisian Railways
 Tunisian Rugby Federation
 Tunisian underground music
 Tunisian War of Independence (1952–1956)
 Tunisian Workers' Communist Party
 Tunisiana (owned by Orascom Telecom Holding)
 Tunisnews

U 

 Union des Travailleurs Tunisiens
 Union Syndicale des Travailleurs de Tunisie
 Unionist Democratic Union

V 

 Vandalic War (533–534)
 Virtual University of Tunisia

W 
 Water supply and sanitation in Tunisia
 Women in Tunisia

Z 

 Zaghouan Governorate
 Zembra
 Zine El Abidine Ben Ali
 Zine El Abidine Ben Ali
 Zirid Dynasty
 Zlebia

See also 

 Outline of Tunisia

 
Tunisia